Bringing Up Father is a 1946 American comedy film, based on the comic strip Bringing Up Father by George McManus, about the adventures of the social-climbing Maggie and her long-suffering husband Jiggs.  Here, one of Maggie's society friends enlists her help in getting an undesirable tenant evicted, a tenant who turns out to be Jiggs himself.  Meanwhile, Jiggs rounds up his friends from the bar to defend his turf.

McManus briefly appears here as himself.  This 1946 production is subsequent to a number of previous Maggie and Jiggs movies, both animated and live-action, notably a silent 1928 Metro-Goldwyn-Mayer film directed by Jack Conway.  This one was successful enough to inspire four more Monogram sequels:

 Jiggs and Maggie in Society (1948)
 Jiggs and Maggie in Court (1948)
 Jiggs and Maggie in Jackpot Jitters (1949)
 Jiggs and Maggie Out West (1950)

All five of these featured former vaudevillian Joe Yule (father of Mickey Rooney) as Jiggs, and were his final films.

Cast 

 Joe Yule as Jiggs
 Renie Riano as Maggie Jiggs
 Tim Ryan as Dinty Moore
 June Harrison as Nora Jiggs
 Wallace Chadwell as Danny
 Tom Kennedy as Murphy
 Laura Treadwell as Mrs. Kermishaw
 William Frambes as Junior Kermishaw
 Pat Goldin as Dugan
 Jack Norton as Norton
 Ferris Taylor as F. Newson Kermishaw
 Tom Dugan as Hod Carrier
 Joe Devlin as Casey
 Fred Kelsey as Tom
 Charles C. Wilson as Frank
 Bob Carleton as Pianist
 George McManus as himself

External links 
 

1946 films
1946 romantic comedy films
American romantic comedy films
Bringing Up Father
Films based on American comics
Films based on comic strips
Films directed by Edward F. Cline
Live-action films based on comics
Monogram Pictures films
1940s English-language films
1940s American films